Bulbophyllum evansii is a species of orchid in the genus Bulbophyllum.

References
"The Bulbophyllum Checklist"
"The Internet Orchid Species Photo"
"World Checklist Of Selected Plant Families" 

evansii